Mir Abdoli-ye Sofla (also Romanized as Mīr ‘Abdolī-ye Soflá) is a village in Kalashi Rural District, Kalashi District, Javanrud County, Kermanshah Province, Iran. At the 2006 census, its population was 113, in 24 families.

References 

Populated places in Javanrud County